François Pollet (died around 1547) was a lawyer from Douai, then in the County of Flanders (Habsburg Netherlands).

Life
Pollet studied law at Leuven University and for a number of years became a lecturer in law at the University of Paris. He was then called to the bar, and returned to his native Douai, where he married and maintained a legal practice. He died young, leaving the incomplete manuscript of a study of Roman legal institutions. His work was later edited and put into print by his son-in-law, Philippe Broïde, a member of the city council of Douai.

Publications
 Historia Fori Romani (Douai, Jan Bogard, 1576) Available on Google Books

References

16th-century deaths
Lawyers of the Habsburg Netherlands
16th-century Latin-language writers
Old University of Leuven alumni
People from Douai
Renaissance humanists